Pantnagar Seeds is the brand name of seeds sold by Uttarakhand Seeds and Tarai Development Corporation Ltd. The corporation was established on 29 June 1969 by Pantnagar University, Government of India and few farmers of the tarai area. Pantnagar seeds played a crucial role in ushering in Green Revolution in India and became a household name in rural India.

External links 
 

Seed companies
Agriculture companies of India
Economy of Uttarakhand
Agriculture in Uttarakhand
Pantnagar